The Best of Cusco is a compilation album by German cross-cultural new-age band Cusco. It was released in early 1997 and includes tracks from the Higher Octave albums Apurimac (released 1988) through Ring of the Dolphin (1996), with the exception that A Choral Christmas (1995) is not represented. Some online retailers also show this item as a release by the label Kitty under the title "History".

Track listing

Charts
The Best of Cusco reached #11 on the Billboard Top New Age Albums chart in 1997.

References

1997 greatest hits albums
Cusco (band) albums